Edward Hutton may refer to:

Edward Francis Hutton (1875–1962), American financier
Edward Hutton (army) (1848–1923), Australian, British, and Canadian military commander
Edward Hutton (writer) (1875–1969), British author